Hatundere is a station on in Hatundere. The station is served by İZBAN's Northern Line.

Railway stations in İzmir Province
Railway stations opened in 1996
1996 establishments in Turkey
Menemen District